is a former Japanese football player.

Playing career
Asari was born in Saitama on June 10, 1974. After graduating from Meiji University, he joined Japan Football League club Tokyo Gas (later FC Tokyo) in 1997. He became a regular player as defensive midfielder from first season. The club also won the 2nd place in 1997 and the champions in 1998 and was promoted to new league J2 League from 1999. In 1999, the club won the 2nd place and was promoted to J1 League from 2000. Although he played many matches for long time, he injured his right knee in August 2004. After the injury, his opportunity to play decreased behind Yasuyuki Konno and Yohei Kajiyama. In 2008, he was appreciated by new manager Hiroshi Jofuku and played many matches. However he could hardly play in the match for injuries in 2009 and retired end of 2009 season.

Club statistics

Honors
J.League Cup : 2004, 2009

References

External links

1974 births
Living people
Meiji University alumni
Association football people from Saitama Prefecture
Japanese footballers
J1 League players
J2 League players
Japan Football League (1992–1998) players
FC Tokyo players
Association football midfielders